Anosmin 1 is a protein that in humans is encoded by the ANOS1 gene.

Function
Mutations in this gene cause the X-linked Kallmann Syndrome. The encoded protein is similar in sequence to proteins known to function in neural cell adhesion and axonal migration. In addition, this cell surface protein is N-glycosylated, and may have antiprotease activity. [provided by RefSeq, Jul 2008].

References

Further reading